The 2021 Sporting Kansas City season was the twenty-sixth season of the team's existence in Major League Soccer and the eleventh year played under the Sporting Kansas City moniker. The season began on April 17.

Summary

Preseason

Sporting KC players reported for a seven day quarantine period involving medical exams and testing on March 1. The team then trained for six weeks beginning on March 8 before the season started on April 17. Sporting KC began a one week voluntary training on March 1 before heading to Arizona on March 7. The team then began preseason training and played 4 preseason matches on March 13, March 20, March 24 and April 3 before returning to Kansas City on April 3.

Current roster

Player movement

In 

Per Major League Soccer and club policies terms of the deals do not get disclosed.

Draft picks 
Draft picks are not automatically signed to the team roster. Only trades involving draft picks and executed after the start of 2020 MLS SuperDraft will be listed in the notes.

Out

Competitions

Preseason
Kickoff times are in CDT (UTC-05) unless shown otherwise

Preseason schedule announced on March 1, 2021.

MLS

Standings

Western Conference

Overall table

Results by round

Match Results

MLS Cup Playoffs

Leagues Cup

Player statistics

Squad appearances and goals
Last updated on September 23, 2020.

|-
! colspan="14" style="background:#dcdcdc; text-align:center"|Goalkeepers

|-
! colspan="14" style="background:#dcdcdc; text-align:center"|Defenders

|-
! colspan="14" style="background:#dcdcdc; text-align:center"|Midfielders

|-
! colspan="14" style="background:#dcdcdc; text-align:center"|Forwards

|-
! colspan=14 style=background:#dcdcdc; text-align:center| Players who have made an appearance or had a squad number this season but have left the club
|-
|}

0+1 means player did came on as a sub once. 1+1 means player started once and came on as a sub once.

References

Sporting Kansas City seasons
Sporting
Sporting Kansas City
Sporting Kansas